Jhanda may refer to:

Jhanda is a town in Swabi District of Khyber-Pakhtunkhwa.
Jhanda Bagga Nawan is a village in the Firozpur district of Punjab, India.
Jhanda (Ludhiana West) is a village in Ludhiana district of Punjab, India. 
Jhanda Singh Dhillon was a famous royal Sikh warrior.
Madho Jhanda is a village in Kapurthala district of Punjab, India.